is a set of two V-Cinema movies, first released in Japanese theaters on June 17, 2017 while DVD and Blu-Ray releases were made on separate dates. It features the crossover between 2012 Metal Hero Series movie Space Sheriff Gavan: The Movie and the twenty-eighth Super Sentai Series entry Tokusou Sentai Dekaranger, both works are distributed by Toei Company. In addition, past actors from Metal Hero Series are also set to appear as guests in the films.

Both films were directed by Koichi Sakamoto and written by Naruhisa Arakawa, who previously worked in Space Sheriffs: Next Generation. Another work from Space Sheriff Gavan was planned since 2015, but production was moved to 2016 due to Sakamoto's scheduling conflicts.

Films

Space Squad: Gavan vs. Dekaranger
 is the first movie and was released on DVD and Blu-Ray on July 19, 2017. It features a joint struggle between the second generation Gavan and the Dekarangers. Lead actor Yuma Ishigaki stated that thinking differences is one of the movie's themes. Ishigaki as well participated in the series' writing while expressing his opinions on the acting. Joining the main cast are also Retsu Ichijouji (Space Sheriff Gavan) and Mad Gallant (Kyojuu Tokusou Juspion). This movie will feature the marriage of Senichi "Sen-chan" Enari/Deka Green and Koume "Umeko" Kodou/Deka Pink, thus making Tokusou Sentai Dekaranger as the first Sentai team whose female members are all married, preceded by Jasmine/Deka Yellow in 10 Years After.

Plot
Geki Jumonji, the new Space Sheriff Gavan and his partner Shelly are about to raid a deal involving Mad Gallant, a member of the Space Criminal Organization Genmaku. However, instead of waiting for backup, Geki decides to confront the enemies himself. The deal is revealed to be a trap, with Mad Gallant defeating Geki and Shelly apparently killed by one of his companions. When Banban "Ban" Akaza from the Fire Squad arrives, he finds a wounded Geki and Shelly's body missing. Though eager to avenge Shelly, Geki is taken off the case by Director Sophie, who claims that in his current state, he is a liability. However, upon having a glance at her monitor, he finds the name of Marika "Jasmine" Hiwatari, a member of Earth's Dekarangers (who has the power of psychometry). Geki interrupts the marriage of Jasmine's fellow Dekarangers Senichi "Sen-chan" Enari and Koume "Umeko" Kodou to ask for their help, seemingly under a request from the Galactic Union Police.

With Houji "Hoji" Tomas, Sen and Umeko in tow, Geki takes Jasmine to the crime scene, where they discover the identity of the shooter, Kuronen, and track him down to Earth where they confront him alongside Mad Gallant and his aid Benikiba as well. During the fight, Gavan's Laser Blade is destroyed, but he is rescued in the nick of time by Ban. As the criminals escape once again, Gavan and the others return to the Dekarangers' base, where their investigation connects Mad Gallant and his cohorts with a mysterious case of hundreds of people drained of all of their blood, and the manufacturing company "Smile and Gentleness". Geki and Umeko then question Lars, the president of Smile and Gentleness, who reveals that he is being threatened by Genmaku, with his secretary being one of their spies sent to keep an eye on him. The policemen then confront the secretary, who reveals herself as Benikiba, so Gavan leaves Umeko behind to protect Lars alone while he goes after Benikiba and Kuronen, only to find no one. When he returns, he finds Lars and a severely wounded Umeko, holding a mysterious black mask.

While Umeko is given medical treatment and the mask is analyzed by Swan, Sen blames Gavan for leaving Umeko behind to chase after vengeance. They also discover that Gavan forged his request for their assistance and he is sent to prison on Planet Bird. While investigating Lars' office, Hoji and Sen discover that Lars and Mad Gallant are the same person, while Benikiba storms the Dekarangers' HQ to extract Lars and return the mask to him, which he uses to transform into Mad Gallant. Lars then reveals that the mask gives him the powers and memories of the original Mad Gallant, who was defeated by Juspion decades ago. Mad Gallant and Benikiba defeat Deka Break and Deka Master before escaping. The Dekarangers investigate further and discover that all of the victims from the bloodsucking case had the ability to transform, and that Shelly had a higher power than the others; implying that she must be alive and being used by Lars to complete his plan. Umeko recovers and reveals that she was not left behind by Gavan, as she asked to deal with Benikiba by herself, but was unaware of Lars' true colors and was stabbed by him. Hoji, Sen, Jasmine, and Umeko then decide to break into the prison where Gavan is being held and rescue him. Ban also appears and joins them to chase after Lars and rescue Shelly.

As Lars beats Shelly in order to have her bleed enough to complete his weapon, "Satan Goth", Benikiba states that her mission assisting him is over and leaves. Gavan and the Dekarangers arrive soon after and while Gavan confronts Lars, the Dekarangers fight and defeat Kuronen. During his fight with Lars, Geki is approached by his senior and the original Gavan, Retsu Ichijouji, who gives him a new Laser Blade, the Laser Blade Origin, which was forged on Juspion's home planet, Ejin. Using it, Geki finally manages to defeat Lars and destroys Mad Gallant's mask. However, Lars lives long enough to activate Satan Gorth before he is destroyed by Ban using the Deka Wing Cannon. After returning to the Galactic Police's base, Sophie reveals to Geki that she and Ban had arranged for him to work with the other Dekarangers since the beginning and Shelly decides to leave Geki's side and work at the main office. Geki is nominated as the first leader of the "Space Squad", instructing him to select other Sentai and Metal Heroes to form a team to take down Genmaku once and for all.

In the post credits, Sen and Umeko resume their marriage ceremony, but when they are about to kiss, an embarrassed Sen becomes constipated and runs to the bathroom, driving Umeko into rage.

Girls in Trouble: Space Squad Episode Zero
 is the second movie and was released on DVD and Blu-Ray on August 9, 2017. This movie focuses as a prologue to Gavan vs. Dekaranger, taking place in the day before the event. It focuses on the female casts of Dekaranger, Space Sheriff Gavan: The Movie and Space Sheriffs: Next Generation. Shooting was made simultaneously with Gavan vs. Dekaranger.

Something happened when Dekarangers' Twin Cam Angel (Jasmine and Umeko) met with Space Detectives Shelly, Sissy and Tammy in the day before Gavan vs. Dekaranger.

Related media

Radio drama
A radio drama was broadcast from May 12, 2017 to June 16, 2017 as a collaboration project with Toei's radio program, . It serves as a prequel to Girls in Trouble and consists of six episodes written by Naruhisa Arakawa.

All six episodes are compiled into two separate arc.

Uchu Sentai Kyuranger
Yuma Ishigaki, Ryuji Sainei, Yousuke Itou, Mika Kikuchi and Tetsu Inada also went on to reprise their respective roles in episode 18 of 2017 Super Sentai Series Uchu Sentai Kyuranger, featuring the crossover of Tokusou Sentai DekaRanger's Ban, Uchuu Keiji Gavan's Geki Jumonji (Gavan's successor), and the 41st installment in the Super Sentai series Uchuu Sentai KyuuRanger.

Cast
Space Squad: Gavan vs. Dekaranger
: 
: 
: 
: 
: 
: 
: 
: 
: 
: 
: 
Receptionist: 
: 
: 
: 
: 
: 
, Priest: 
: 
Narration: 

Girls in Trouble: Space Squad Episode Zero
Marika Hiwatari: Ayumi Kinoshita
Koume Kodou: Mika Kikuchi
Shelly: Suzuka Morita
: 
: 
: 
: 
Benikiba: Mikie Hara
Sophie: Ryoko Yuui
: 
: 
Doggie Kruger (Voice): Tetsu Inada
Mad Gallant (Voice): Junichi Haruta
Narration: Hiroshi Kamiya

Theme songs

Lyrics: , YOFFY
Composition: 
Arrangement: Project.R (Michiaki Watanabe and Koichiro Kameyama)
Artists:  (Akira Kushida and YOFFY)
The theme song of Gavan vs. Dekaranger.

Lyrics: 
Composition/Arrangement: YOFFY
Artists:  (Ayumi Kinoshita, Mika Kikuchi, Suzuka Morita, Misaki Momose and Mayu Kawamoto)
The ending theme of Girls in Trouble.

Notes

Bibliography
 
 Uchusen（Hobby Japan）
 

 Toei Hero MAX（Tatsumi Publishing）

References

External links 

 

Films directed by Koichi Sakamoto
2010s Super Sentai films
Metal Hero films
Crossover tokusatsu films
2017 films